Bruschi is an Italian surname. Notable people with the surname include:

 Abigaille Bruschi-Chiatti (c. 1855–after 1888), Italian soprano
 Andrea Bruschi (born 1968), Italian actor
 Domenico Bruschi (1840–1910), Italian painter
 Pietro Bruschi (born 1952), Italian sprint canoer 
 Tedy Bruschi (born 1973), former professional American football linebacker
 Ramiro Washington Bruschi (born 1981), Uruguayan football forward

See also 
 Brusco

Italian-language surnames